Below is a list of presidents of the National Assembly of Niger.

The National Assembly is Niger's sole legislative body and was established through reforms of the Colony of Niger's Constituent Council during the French colonial period. It operated from 1958, through independence in 1960, until the 1974 Nigerien coup d'état. During the course of military rule (1974–1991) a consultative body (the High Council of the Republic of Niger) was reformed to become analogous to a National Assembly. This functioned as a caretaker National Assembly during the Constitutional Convention period of the Second (1991–1993) and was reconstituted as the National Assembly in the Third Republic (1993–1996). Following the 1996 Nigerien coup d'état the National Assembly was again suspended, and reinstituted in 1997 under the Fourth Republic. Again, following the 1999 Nigerien coup d'état, the National Assembly was suspended, but this time was reconstituted within the year under the Fifth Republic. After the 2010 Nigerien coup d'état, it was suspended again.

During the Colony of Niger

During the First Republic and Second Republic

President of the High Council of the Republic

Presidents of the National Assembly of Niger

President of the National Consultative Council

Presidents of the National Assembly of Niger

References

Myriam Gervais. "Niger: Regime Change Economic Crisis and Perpetuation of Privilege". pp. 86–108. Political Reform in Francophone Africa, Ed. John Frank Clark, David E. Gardinier. Westview Press (1997) 
Leonardo A. Villalon and Abdourahmane Idrissa. "Repetitive Breakdowns and a Decade of Experimentation: Institutional Choices and Unstable Democracy in Niger", pp. 27–48 in The Fate of Africa's Democratic Experiments: Elites and Institutions, ed. Leonardo Alfonso Villalón, Peter VonDoepp. Indiana University Press (2005) 
Pierre Englebert, Katharine Murison. "Niger: Recent History", pp. 856–865 in Africa South of the Sahara, 2007; ed. Iain Frame. Routledge (2006) 

Politics of Niger
Niger, National Assembly